Live at the Royal Festival Hall is an album by Dizzy Gillespie and the United Nation Orchestra. It won the Grammy Award for Best Large Jazz Ensemble Album in 1991. The concert was also released on DVD.

Reception
The AllMusic review stated "every selection on this excellent CD works" and awarded the album four stars. The JazzTimes review stated "Though Dizzy's tone and technique had slipped a bit in his 72nd year, he could always summon the magic when he needed to... It's a wonder the walls of the Hall didn't come tumbling down".

Track listing
All compositions by Dizzy Gillespie except where noted.

 "Tin Tin Deo" (Dizzy Gillespie, Gil Fuller, Chano Pozo) - 10:14 
 "Seresta: Samba for Carmen" (Paquito D'Rivera, Hank Levy) - 8:31 
 "And Then She Stopped" - 7:26 
 "Tanga" - 14:09 
 "Kush" - 9:08 
 "Dizzy Shells" (Steve Turre) - 6:19 
 "A Night in Tunisia" (Gillespie, Felix Paparelli) - 18:51

(The DVD includes additional vocal features of "Moody's Mood for Love" by James Moody and "Esquinas" by Flora Purim.)

Personnel
 Dizzy Gillespie—trumpet
 Claudio Roditi – trumpet, percussion
 Arturo Sandoval – trumpet, flugelhorn, piccolo trumpet
 Slide Hampton – trombone, arranger
 Steve Turre – trombone, bass trombone, shells
 Paquito D'Rivera – alto saxophone, clarinet, percussion
 James Moody – alto saxophone, tenor saxophone, flute, percussion
 Mario Rivera – tenor saxophone, soprano saxophone, percussion
 John Lee – bass guitar
 Ed Cherry – guitar
 Danilo Pérez – piano
 Flora Purim – vocals
 Ignacio Berroa – drums, percussion
 Airto Moreira – percussion, drums
 Giovanni Hidalgo – percussion, congas

References 

Dizzy Gillespie live albums
1990 live albums
Albums recorded at the Royal Festival Hall
Enja Records live albums
Grammy Award for Best Large Jazz Ensemble Album